Mokopane, also known as Potgietersrus, is a town in the Limpopo province of South Africa.

The town name was changed to Mokopane in 2003 in honour of a local Ma Nrebele leader, King Mghombane Gheghana , who ruled the area before being conquered by the Voortrekkers. Mokopane is the Northern Sotho form of the king’s name, and is hence erroneous, even though the majority language in the area is Northern Sotho. Five kingdoms in the vicinity of the town are Kekana (Moshate), Langa (Mapela), Lebelo (Garasvlei) and Langa (Bakenburg). It is still referred to as Potgietersrus or “Potties”.

Two hours from Gauteng by road, the town acts as a getaway destination and as a stop-over for travelers en route to Botswana, Zimbabwe and Kruger National Park. The area is typical bushveld with many Vachellia and Senegalia trees (formerly part of the acacia genus) as well as aloes, which blooms in June and July. The Zebediela Citrus Estate, 55 km to the southeast, is one of the largest citrus farms in the southern hemisphere.

History
In 1852, Mokopane was called Vredenburg, which means “the town of peace” thus named by the Voortrekkers, a pioneering group of Afrikaners who had trekked north-eastward from the Cape Colony in the 19th century into South Africa's interior. Later, in 1858, the Voortrekker legacy continued when the town was renamed Pietpotgietersrust, in honour of Piet Potgieter, who had been fatally wounded in the Makapan Cave attack that took place four years prior. He was the eldest son of the Voortrekker leader Andries Potgieter. The memorialised town name was later shortened to Potgietersrus. 

As the years progressed, many factors such as malaria and hostility between the Voortrekkers and the Ndebele people caused the trekkers to abandon the Potgieterus settlement in 1870. Later the site would be re-occupied from 1890 onward.

The historic and archaeologically significant Makapansgat caves are situated 15 km north of the town. Recovery of Homo habilis habitation has been made at these caves.

Remains of Australopithecus africanus have also been found at the caves. The Arend Dieperink Museum portrays the history of the town, from the ape-man at Makapansgat, Bushmen paintings and early activities in the area up to the South African War and more recent times.

Culture
The stunning bushveld environment and influences from North Sotho, Ndebele, Tsonga, Afrikaans and English cultures give Mokopane a unique character. There are also ancient caves, the "Big Five", San rock paintings, curios, bushveld food and drinks such as biltong (dried meat) and mampoer (a potent alcoholic drink), tropical gardens and traditional dancing. In the adjacent township of Mahwelereng traditional lifestyles, set against the spectacular Waterberg, can be observed. Mokopane also offers outdoor activities ranging from hiking, camping and 4 × 4 trails to birding, angling and game viewing.

Economy
The economy of Mokopane used to be primarily based on agriculture, until the opening of Anglo American's platinum mine. Currently the mine is the biggest contributor to the local economy. Recently there has been interest displayed by other mining companies to start up, but community resistance around mining remains the main reason for the slow growth in mining.  The Mokopane area is one of South Africa's richest agricultural areas, producing wheat, tobacco, cotton, beef, maize, peanuts and citrus. The area around Mokopane is rich in minerals with the mining of platinum, diamonds and granite.

Climate 
Mokopane lies 1150m above sea level, Mokopane's climate is a local steppe climate. During the year there is little rainfall. This location is classified as BSh by Köppen and Geiger. The average temperature in Mokopane is 27.3 °C | 81.14 °F. The annual rainfall is 495 mm | 19.5 inch.

Precipitation is the lowest in July, with an average of 1 mm | 0.0 inch. Most of the precipitation here falls in January, averaging 94 mm | 3.7 inch.

At an average temperature of 23.4 °C | 74.1 °F, January is the hottest month of the year. June is the coldest month, with temperatures averaging 13.0 °C | 55.4 °F

Local residents
Daniel Heese

See also

Makapansgat pebble
Mokopane Biodiversity Conservation Centre

References

External links

Mogalakwena municipality infosite; accessed 27 August 2014.

Populated places in the Mogalakwena Local Municipality